Peter Falconer Beathard (born March 7, 1942) is a former American football quarterback who played professionally in the American Football League (AFL), the National Football League (NFL), and the World Football League (WFL). He is the younger brother of former NFL executive Bobby Beathard and is current Jacksonville Jaguars quarterback C. J. Beathard’s great-uncle.

College career
Born and raised in southern California, Beathard graduated from El Segundo High School in 1960 and played college football in Los Angeles at USC.

As a junior, he led the Trojans to the national championship in 1962. Both he and Ron Vander Kelen, the Wisconsin quarterback were named the Players Of The Game in the 1963 Rose Bowl, which USC won, 42–37.

Professional career
Beathard was the fifth overall selection in 1964 NFL draft (Detroit Lions) and the second overall pick in the AFL draft by the Kansas City Chiefs, where he signed and backed up Len Dawson.

In October 1967, Beathard was traded during his fourth season to the Houston Oilers in exchange for defensive tackle Ernie Ladd and quarterback Jacky Lee. He led the Oilers to the Eastern division title, but lost 40–7 to the Oakland Raiders in the AFL championship game. Beathard's playing time in 1968 was curtailed due to appendicitis, and in 1969 he took the Oilers to the four-team AFL playoffs.

Beathard was traded to the Cardinals in 1970, the Rams in August 1972, and returned to the Chiefs in 1973.

In March 1974, he was selected by the Houston Texans in the first round (10th overall) of the WFL Pro Draft. He was waived by the Chiefs in September 1974, he finished his pro career in the short-lived World Football League (WFL), with the Portland Storm in 1974, and the Chicago Winds in 1975. He was briefly on the roster of the Oakland Raiders in October 1975.

See also
 List of American Football League players

References

External links
 

1942 births
Living people
American football quarterbacks
USC Trojans football players
Houston Oilers players
St. Louis Cardinals (football) players
Los Angeles Rams players
Kansas City Chiefs players
Chicago Winds players
Portland Storm players
Sportspeople from Los Angeles County, California
People from Hermosa Beach, California
Players of American football from California
American Football League players
El Segundo High School alumni